The Suspect is a 1975 Italian thriller-drama film directed by Francesco Maselli.

Plot 
Fascism has forced the leadership of the Italian Communist Party to settle in Paris.  In Italy arrests of militants are decimating the organization, so Emilio is sent on a mission in the area of Turin, to put out of harm whistleblowers.

Cast 
Gian Maria Volonté: Emilio
Annie Girardot: Teresa
Renato Salvatori: Gavino Pintus
Gabriele Lavia: Giacomo La Rosa
Bruno Corazzari: Tommaso Lenzini 
Felice Andreasi: Alessandri
Antonio Casale: Resta
Pietro Biondi:  OVRA Agent
Franco Balducci: Funzionario

References

External links

1975 films
1970s thriller drama films
Italian thriller drama films
1970s Italian-language films
Films directed by Francesco Maselli
1975 drama films
1970s Italian films
Films set in 1934